Knock may refer to:

Places

Northern Ireland
 Knock, Belfast, County Down
 Knock, County Armagh, a townland in County Armagh

Republic of Ireland
 Knock, County Clare, village in County Clare
 Knock, County Mayo, village in County Mayo
 Knock Shrine, a major Roman Catholic pilgrimage site in the village of Knock, County Mayo
 Ireland West Airport Knock, commonly known as Knock Airport

Scotland
 Knock, Mull, a place on the Isle of Mull, Argyll and Bute, Scotland
 Knock, Moray, a location
 Knock, Isle of Lewis, Outer Hebrides
 Knock railway station (Scotland), Aberdeenshire

Elsewhere
 Knock, Cumbria, England
 Knock, East Frisia, Germany

Art and entertainment
 Knock (play), 1923, by Jules Romains about a doctor
 "Knock" (short story), by Fredric Brown, supposedly the shortest short-story ever written
 The Knock (1994-2000), a UK television drama
 "The Knock (Drums of Death, Pt. 2)", a song by UNKLE from the album Psyence Fiction (1998)
 Knock, a 2017 French film starring Omar Sy

Other uses
 Knock, to rap on a door
 Knock, a slang term meaning to render a negative evaluation or assessment
 Engine knocking, in spark-ignition internal combustion engines
 Knock Nevis, a Norwegian supertanker formerly known as Seawise Giant, Happy Giant, and Jahre Viking
 The Knock, another term for hitting the wall
 The Knock, a slang term for HM Revenue and Customs

See also
 Getting the wind knocked out of you
 Knock Castle (disambiguation)
 Knock Knock (disambiguation)
 Knockabout (disambiguation)
 Knocking (disambiguation)
 Knockout, a winning criterion in some combat sports
 Knocks (disambiguation)
 Knokke, Belgium
 Nauck (disambiguation)
 NOC (disambiguation)
 Nock (disambiguation)
 Total Knock Out, also known as TKO